Post SG Danzig was a German association football club from the city of Danzig, West Prussia (today Gdańsk, Poland). It was the sports club of the city's postal workers and used the colours blue and yellow traditionally associated with the post office. In the early 1940s, the team was part of the Gauliga Danzig-Westpreußen, then one of the Germany's regional first division circuits, where they earned only lower table finishes. SG was active until September 1945 and disappeared following World War II when the city became part of Poland.

External links 
Das deutsche Fußball-Archiv historical German domestic league tables 
Der Fußball in Ostpreussen und Danzig football in East Prussia and Danzig

References

Football clubs in Germany
Defunct football clubs in Germany
Defunct football clubs in former German territories
Sport in Gdańsk
History of Gdańsk
Works association football clubs in Germany